Malosukhoyazovo (Bäläkäy Soqayaź) is a rural locality (a selo) in Suslovsky Selsoviet, Birsky District, Bashkortostan, Russia. The population was 607 as of 2010. There are 5 streets.

Geography 
Malosukhoyazovo is located 22 km east of Birsk (the district's administrative centre) by road. Yemashevo is the nearest rural locality.

References 

Rural localities in Birsky District